Persean may refer to:

the mythological Perseus
current or former pupils of The Perse School in Cambridge